Thea may refer to:
 Thea (name), a given name
 Ancient Greek term for goddess, including an alternative spelling of Theia
 Thea, the former name of the tea plant genus, now included in Camellia
 Thea, a village in the municipal unit Messatida, Achaea, Greece
 Thea (award), the annual award from the Themed Entertainment Association
 Thea (New-Gen), a Marvel Comics New-Gen character
 Thea (TV series), a 1993 short-lived television series starring Thea Vidale and Brandy Norwood
 Tampa-Hillsborough Expressway Authority, a regional expressway authority based in Hillsborough County, Florida
 Another word for the mythological animal theow
 "Thea", a song by Goldfrapp from Tales of Us
 Theia (planet), a planet hypothesized to have collided with Earth 4.5 billion years ago to form the moon
 Thea, a video game series beginning with Thea: The Awakening

See also
 Theia (disambiguation)
 Thia (disambiguation)